"Super Duper Love (Are You Diggin' on Me)" is a song by Willie "Sugar Billy" Garner, released in 1975 as a single from his 1975 album Super Duper Love. It interpolates parts of Aretha Franklin's 1968 version of Young Rascals' song "Groovin'". It was made famous when English singer Joss Stone covered the song's part one for her debut album, The Soul Sessions (2003), from which it was released in May 2004 as the second and final single under the title "Super Duper Love". A live performance of James Brown's 1966 song "It's a Man's Man's Man's World", retitled "It's a Man's Man's World", is included as a B-side to the CD single.

Joss Stone version

English singer Joss Stone covered "Super Duper Love" for her debut studio album, The Soul Sessions. The song was released as the album's second and final single on May 10, 2004. It was later included on her 2011 compilation album, The Best of Joss Stone 2003–2009.

Commercial performance
"Super Duper Love" debuted and peaked at number 18 on the UK Singles Chart. It also peaked at number seven on the UK R&B Singles Chart.

Track listings
UK and European CD single
 "Super Duper Love (Are You Diggin' on Me?) Pt. 1"  – 3:47
 "It's a Man's Man's World"  – 3:35

UK limited-edition 7-inch single
A. "Super Duper Love (Are You Diggin' on Me?) Pt. 1"  – 3:47
B. "It's a Man's Man's World"  – 3:35

Credits and personnel
Credits are lifted from the UK 7-inch single and The Soul Sessions booklet.

Studios
 Recorded on April 9, 2003, at The Hit Factory Criteria (Miami, Florida)
 Mastered at Sterling Sound (New York City)

Personnel

 Willie Garner – writing
 Joss Stone – lead vocals
 Betty Wright – backing vocals, production
 Jeanette Wright – backing vocals
 Namphuyo Aisha McCray – backing vocals
 Willie "Little Beaver" Hale – guitar
 Angelo Morris – guitar
 Jack Daley – bass

 Timmy Thomas – organ
 Benny Latimore – piano
 Cindy Blackman – drums
 Ignacio Nunez – percussion
 Mike Mangini – tambourine, production
 Steve Greenberg – production
 Steve Greenwell – engineering, mixing
 Chris Gehringer – mastering

Charts

References

1974 singles
1974 songs
2004 singles
Joss Stone songs
Music videos directed by David LaChapelle
Relentless Records singles
Virgin Records singles